Broderick is a surname and given name.

Broderick may also refer to:

Places
Broderick, California, a former town in California
Broderick Park, a municipal park in Buffalo, New York
Broderick County, Kansas Territory, a county from 1859 to 1861 in the present US state of Kansas
Broderick, Saskatchewan, a village in Canada
Broderick Falls, Kenya
Mount Broderick, a mountain in California

Others
18766 Broderick, an asteroid